Portage Lake is a town in Aroostook County, Maine, United States. The population was 359 at the 2020 census.

Geography

Portage Lake is located along Maine State Route 11, which runs north–south and is the only state road in town. The town is located south of Fort Kent and west of both Caribou and Presque Isle, which are the closest commercial centers.

Demographics

2010 census
As of the census of 2010, there were 391 people, 188 households, and 123 families living in the town. The racial makeup of the town was 95.9% White, 0.3% African American, 1.0% Native American, and 2.8% from two or more races.

There were 188 households, of which 17.0% had children under the age of 18 living with them, 57.4% were married couples living together, 5.9% had a female householder with no husband present, 2.1% had a male householder with no wife present, and 34.6% were non-families. 27.7% of all households were made up of individuals, and 12.8% had someone living alone who was 65 years of age or older. The average household size was 2.08 and the average family size was 2.45.

The median age in the town was 56.2 years. 12% of residents were under the age of 18; 3.6% were between the ages of 18 and 24; 15.8% were from 25 to 44; 41.2% were from 45 to 64; and 27.4% were 65 years of age or older. The gender makeup of the town was 50.4% male and 49.6% female.

2000 census
As of the census of 2000, there were 390 people, 183 households, and 116 families living in the town.  The population density was 12.7 people per square mile (4.9/km).  There were 485 housing units at an average density of 15.8 per square mile (6.1/km).  The racial makeup of the town was 99.74% White, 0.26% from other races. Hispanic or Latino of any race were 0.26% of the population.

There were 183 households, out of which 17.5% had children under the age of 18 living with them, 58.5% were married couples living together, 3.3% had a female householder with no husband present, and 36.1% were non-families. 26.8% of all households were made up of individuals, and 9.3% had someone living alone who was 65 years of age or older.  The average household size was 2.11 and the average family size was 2.53.

In the town, the population was spread out, with 14.4% under the age of 18, 3.6% from 18 to 24, 25.1% from 25 to 44, 38.5% from 45 to 64, and 18.5% who were 65 years of age or older.  The median age was 48 years. For every 100 females, there were 109.7 males.  For every 100 females age 18 and over, there were 104.9 males.

The median income for a household in the town was $32,232, and the median income for a family was $40,000. Males had a median income of $35,104 versus $18,542 for females. The per capita income for the town was $17,983.  About 8.2% of families and 9.8% of the population were below the poverty line, including none of those under age 18 and 22.4% of those age 65 or over.

History
The name of the city was borrowed from the name of the lake that occupies much of the center of town. The word portage comes from French and means "to carry". The town was first settled in 1844 by lumbermen from Canada. In 1872, the settlement was organized as a plantation and in 1909 it was incorporated as a town.
The Stevens were the founders of Portage.

Notable people
Lucy Hayward Barker, painter, born in Portage Lake

References

External links
www.aroostook.com/portage

Towns in Aroostook County, Maine
Portages in the United States
Towns in Maine